Shadow war may refer to:

Games
 GURPS Voodoo: The Shadow War, a 1995 role-playing game
 Cutthroat: The Shadow Wars, a 1988 role-playing game

Videogames
 SpellForce 2: Shadow Wars, 2006 videogame
 MAG: Shadow War, 2010 videogame
 Tom Clancy's Ghost Recon: Shadow Wars, 2011 videogame
 Stickman Legends: Shadow War, 2017 videogame; see List of most-downloaded Google Play applications

Other uses
 Shadow War (Babylon 5), a number of wars in the Babylon 5 fictional universe
 "The Shadow War!" (episode), 2018 season 1 episode 23 of DuckTales; see List of DuckTales (2017 TV series) episodes
 Shadow War (DC Comics), a comic book story arc
 Shadow Wars (book), a 2003 non-fiction book by David Pugliese

See also

 Shadow Warriors (disambiguation)
 Shadow of War (disambiguation)
 Chronicles of the Shadow War, a LucasFilm fictional universe built from Willow
 Forsaken World: War of Shadows, 2012 videogame
 A War of Shadows, 1952 non-fiction book by W. Stanley Moss
 Wars of Light and Shadow, a fantasy novel series by Janny Wurts